The Manleluag Spring Protected Landscape is a protected area containing natural hot springs in the Ilocos Region of the Philippines. It is one of 34 protected landscapes in the Philippines located in the municipality of Mangatarem, Pangasinan in the west-central area of the island of Luzon.

History
It was originally established in 1934 as the Manleluag Spring Forest Reserve covering approximately  through Proclamation No. 659 signed by Governor-General Frank Murphy.

It is one of only two protected areas in Pangasinan, the other being the Hundred Islands National Park.

Description
It is part of the Mangatarem forest which straddles the provinces of Pangasinan, Zambales and Tarlac in the Zambales Mountain Range. The park is crossed by two rivers, the Baracbac and Basican rivers.

Of the 1,935 hectares of the park's total area, 412.5 ha. are reserved for wildlife habitat, 539.46 ha. for sustainable uses, 57.34 ha. for multiple uses, 15.7 ha. for restoration, and 91.7 ha. for recreation. A series of pathways and foot trails provide access to areas around the park which is surrounded by patrol trails and fire lines in the buffer area for forest fire protection purposes.

Biodiversity
The protected landscape is an important biodiversity area. It is home to over 90 bird species, including the Philippine frogmouth, rufous hornbill, Philippine hanging parrot, Philippine duck, flame-breasted fruit dove, coleto, malkoha, and ashy thrush. Its forest also supports the Philippine deer, wild boar, cloud rat, Philippine warty pig, and reptiles like the water monitor.

References

Protected landscapes of the Philippines
Hot springs of the Philippines
Geography of Pangasinan
Landforms of Pangasinan
Tourist attractions in Pangasinan
Protected areas established in 1934
1934 establishments in the Philippines